Łukasz Wacławski (born 2 May 1980) is a Polish entrepreneur, dog trainer and professional darts player who plays in World Darts Federation (WDF) and Professional Darts Corporation (PDC) events. He is a Kiev Masters and Ukraine Open champion.

Career
Wacławski began his career in the early 2000s. For many years he has been representing the local sports club Rekiny Warszawskie (Warsaw Sharks), playing together with Krzysztof Ratajski. After winning the finals of the Polish Super League in 2017, he took part in several international World Darts Federation tournaments in the following season. In May 2018, he advanced to the final of the Vilnius Open, where he lost to Ben Hazel by 1–6 in legs. Three months later, he won two international tournaments held in Kiev. In the Kiev Masters, he beat Oleksii Bushui by 5–1 in legs. In the Ukraine Open, he beat Andrey Pontus by 5–3 in legs.

Thanks to his victory in both tournaments, he was invited to participate in the 2018 Winmau World Masters. However, his competition in the tournament ended very quickly, because he lost to Marty Moreland by 2–3 in sets. A year later, he competed again in the 2019 World Masters and this time he was also eliminated in the first round. He lost to Andrew Kateley by 2–3 in sets.

At his first PDC Challenge Tour tournament in 2019, he reached the Last 32 phase, however he only played the opening weekend, four events. In 2019, he once again took part in tournaments held in Ukraine. In the Ukraine Open and Kiev Masters, he ended his participation in the quarter-finals.

Personal life
Wacławski runs the innovative training program Smart Darts Training and he help beginning players with create a real training plan. In addition, he is engaged in dog training.

Performance timeline

References

1980 births
Living people
Polish darts players